Disorganized schizophrenia, or hebephrenia, was a subtype of schizophrenia prior to 2013. Subtypes of schizophrenia were no longer recognized as separate conditions in the DSM 5, published in 2013. The disorder is no longer listed in the 11th revision of the International Classification of Diseases (ICD-11).

Disorganized schizophrenia was classified within ICD-10 the existing classification, in practice, until January 1,  2022, as a mental and behavioural disorder,  because the classification was thought to be an extreme expression of the disorganization syndrome that has been hypothesized to be one aspect of a three-factor model of symptoms in schizophrenia, the other factors being reality distortion (involving delusions and hallucinations) and psychomotor poverty (lack of speech, lack of spontaneous movement and various aspects of blunting of emotion).

Presentation
The condition is also known as hebephrenia, named after the Greek term for "adolescence" – ἥβη (hḗbē) – and possibly the ancient-Greek goddess of youth, Hebe, daughter of Hera. The term refers to the ostensibly more prominent appearance of the disorder in persons around puberty.

The prominent characteristics of this form are disorganized behavior and speech (see formal thought disorder), including loosened associations and schizophasia ("word salad"), and flat or inappropriate affect. In addition, psychiatrists must rule out any possible sign of catatonic schizophrenia.

The most prominent features of disorganized schizophrenia are not delusions and hallucinations, as in paranoid schizophrenia, although fragmentary delusions (unsystemized and often hypochondriacal) and hallucinations may be present. A person with disorganized schizophrenia may also experience behavioral disorganization, which may impair his or her ability to carry out daily activities such as showering or eating.

The emotional responses of such people often seem strange or inappropriate. Inappropriate facial responses may be common, and behavior is sometimes described as "silly", such as inappropriate laughter. Sometimes, there is a complete lack of emotion, including anhedonia (lack of pleasure), and avolition (lack of motivation). Some of these features are also present in other types of schizophrenia, but they are most prominent in disorganized schizophrenia.

Treatment
This form of schizophrenia is typically associated with early onset (often between the ages of 15 and 25 years) and is thought to have a poor prognosis because of the rapid development of negative symptoms and decline in social functioning.

Use of electroconvulsive therapy has been proposed; however, the effectiveness after treatment is in question.

See also
 Catatonia
 Communication deviance
 Paranoid schizophrenia

References

External links 

Schizophrenia
Obsolete terms for mental disorders